The centerfold of a magazine is a picture printed on a single sheet of paper and inserted in the middle of the publication.

Centerfold may also refer to:

Centerfold (group), a Dutch girl band
"Centerfold" (song), a 1981 song by The J. Geils Band
"Centerfold", a song from the 2006 album I'm Not Dead by Pink
"Centerfold", a song from the 2002 album Party Warriors by Captain Jack
"Centrefolds", a song from the 2003 album Sleeping with Ghosts by Placebo